Józef Oksiutycz (19 February 1904 – 15 July 1965) was a Polish cyclist. He competed in the team pursuit event at the 1928 Summer Olympics.

References

External links
 

1904 births
1965 deaths
Polish male cyclists
Olympic cyclists of Poland
Cyclists at the 1928 Summer Olympics
Cyclists from Warsaw